Jayaprithvi (ancient name Chainpur) is a municipality and the district headquarter of Bajhang District in Sudurpashchim Province of Nepal that was established on 18 May 2014 by merging the two former Village development committees Rithapata, Chainpur, Hemantabada, Luyanta and Subeda. It lies on the bank of Seti River. At the time of the 2011 Nepal census it had a population of 22,191 people living in 4,015 individual households.

Transportation  
Bajhang Airport lies in Old-Rithapata.

References

Populated places in Bajhang District
Municipalities in Bajhang District
2014 establishments in Nepal
Nepal municipalities established in 2014